Rabbi Toba Spitzer became the first openly lesbian or gay person chosen to head a rabbinical association in the United States in 2007, when she was elected president of the Reconstructionist Rabbinical Association at the group's annual convention, in Scottsdale, Arizona.

Spitzer leads Congregation Dorshei Tzedek in West Newton, Massachusetts. She is the author of God Is Here: Reimagining the Divine (2022).

References

External links
Spitzer's biography on the Dorshei Tzedek website

American Reconstructionist rabbis
LGBT rabbis
LGBT people from Massachusetts
Reconstructionist women rabbis
Lesbians
Living people
Year of birth missing (living people)
21st-century American rabbis